Bocian is a Polish surname. It may refer to:

 Elżbieta Bocian (1931–2013), Polish sprinter
 Jacek Bocian (born 1976), Polish sprinter
 Łukasz Bocian (born 1988), Polish footballer
 Paweł Bocian (born 1973), Polish footballer

See also
 

Polish-language surnames